M1 Finance (commonly abbreviated as M1) is an American financial services company.   Founded in 2015, the company offers a robo-advisory investment platform with brokerage accounts, digital checking accounts, and lines of credit. M1 offers an electronic trading platform for the trade of financial assets including common stocks, preferred stocks, fractional-share ownership, and exchange-traded funds. It provides margin lending, automatic rebalancing services, automatic dividend reinvestment services, and cash management services including debit cards. The company receives payment for order flow. The platform has over $6 billion in assets under management. M1's headquarters is located in Chicago, Illinois.  As of November 2021, the company had over 500,000 members.

References

External links 

Companies based in Chicago
Financial services companies established in 2015
2015 establishments in Illinois